Jacob Worm Skjelderup (3 December 1804 – 2 September 1863) was Norwegian state secretary from 1859 to 1863, appointed Minister of the Navy in 1860, and temporary councillor of state in 1861.

References

1804 births
1863 deaths
Government ministers of Norway